Corinth Christian Methodist Episcopal Church is a historic church at 1180 L & E Junction Road in Winchester, Kentucky. It was added to the National Register in 2007.

It served as a church for a black congregation for more than a century.

References

See also
National Register of Historic Places listings in Kentucky

Christian Methodist Episcopal churches in Kentucky
Churches on the National Register of Historic Places in Kentucky
Churches in Clark County, Kentucky
National Register of Historic Places in Clark County, Kentucky
Gothic Revival church buildings in Kentucky